Wanderley de Jesus Sousa or simply Derley  (born 2 August 1986), is a Brazilian midfielder who plays for Fortaleza.

References

1986 births
Living people
Brazilian footballers
Sport Club Internacional players
Clube Náutico Capibaribe players
Club Athletico Paranaense players
Emirates Club players
Dibba FC players
Club León footballers
Santa Cruz Futebol Clube players
Campeonato Brasileiro Série A players
Campeonato Brasileiro Série B players
Liga MX players
Brazilian expatriate footballers
Expatriate footballers in the United Arab Emirates
Brazilian expatriate sportspeople in the United Arab Emirates
Expatriate footballers in Mexico
Brazilian expatriate sportspeople in Mexico
Association football midfielders
UAE Pro League players
People from Anápolis
Sportspeople from Goiás